Malansac is a commune in the Morbihan department of Brittany in north-western France.

Geography
The river Arz forms all of the commune's northern border.

Map

Demographics
Inhabitants of Malansac are called in French Malansacais.

See also
Communes of the Morbihan department

References

External links

Official site 

 Mayors of Morbihan Association 

Communes of Morbihan